Andrew Grant, M.D. (fl. 1809) was a physician and writer.

Grant wrote a History of Brazil, 8vo, London, 1809, of which a French translation, with additions, appeared at St. Petersburg in 1811.

References

 

18th-century English male writers
18th-century British historians
19th-century British historians
19th-century English medical doctors
Writers on Latin America
Place of birth unknown
Year of birth missing
19th-century deaths
Year of death missing